The Best Year of My Life is the ninth studio album by American country music artist Eddie Rabbitt. It was released in 1984 under the Warner Bros. Records label, but the rights to the album have since been sold to Liberty Records. The album marked the end of Rabbitt's crossover success. Four singles were released from the album including "B-B-B-Burnin' Up With Love", which peaked at No. 3 on country charts, the title track, which rose to No. 1, "Warning Sign", which charted at No. 4 and "She's Comin' Back to Say Goodbye", which peaked at No. 6. The album itself ranked No. 22 on the country albums chart.

Track listing
All songs written by Eddie Rabbitt and Even Stevens except as indicated.

Personnel
 Adapted from AllMusic:
Eddie Rabbitt - vocals
 Matt Betton - drums
 Spady Brannan - bass
 Larry Byrom - guitar
 David Hungate - bass
 John Barlow Jarvis - keyboards
 Paul Leim - percussion
 Randy McCormick - keyboards
 Paul Overstreet - vocals
 Tom Robb - bass
 Even Stevens - percussion
 Billy Joe Walker Jr. - guitar
 Reggie Young - guitar

Chart performance

Weekly charts

Year-end charts

Singles

References

Best Year of My Life, yahoo.com.

1984 albums
Eddie Rabbitt albums
Warner Records albums